Rhonda Earlene Wilcox (née Meads; born 3 November 1961) is a former New Zealand netballer who played for the New Zealand national team, the Silver Ferns, on 20 occasions.

Early life and family
Wilcox was born Rhonda Earlene Meads on 3 November 1961, the daughter Colin and Verna Meads. Her father was a leading rugby union player in the 1950s and 1960s, representing his country as a member of the All Blacks in international  test matches on 55 occasions. One of five siblings, Wilcox was raised on a farm on the outskirts of Te Kuiti in the North Island of New Zealand, and educated at Te Kuiti High School. Her youngest sister, Shelley Mitchell, played for the New Zealand women's basketball team in 1991 and 1992.

Netball career
Wilcox was first selected to play for the Silver Ferns in 1982, becoming, with her father, the first All Black–Silver Fern, father–daughter combination. In 1982, she toured England, playing her first test match on 13 November. Wilcox played in the 1983 World Netball Championships in Singapore, where New Zealand lost to Australia in the final. In 1985, at the World Games held in London, she switched to playing as the goal keeper (GK). New Zealand won the gold medal, beating Australia in the final.

After retiring from top-level competition, Wilcox continued to play, including for the Riverlands team in the Waikato region, when she played alongside her sister, Shelley Mitchell.

Later life
From 1998 to 2016, Wilcox worked as a supply manager for Air New Zealand. She also occasionally served as a scout for the Silver Ferns.

References

1961 births
Living people
Sportspeople from Te Kūiti
People educated at Te Kuiti High School
New Zealand international netball players
1983 World Netball Championships players
Netball players at the 1985 World Games
World Games gold medalists
Waikato Bay of Plenty Magic coaches